Needham Market Football Club is a football club based in Needham Market, Suffolk, England.

History
Although records show the existence of a Needham Market Football Club during the late 1890s, the modern club was officially established in 1919. They subsequently joined the Ipswich & District League. After finishing as runners-up in Division 3A in 1930–31 and 1931–32, the club were promoted to Division Two A. They went on to win Division Two A in 1932–33 and were runners-up the following season. After World War II they won the Division Two title in 1946–47 and went on to win Division One in 1952–53. The club won the League Cup in 1977–78 and again in 1979–80. However, they finished bottom of the Senior Division in 1983–84 and were relegated to Division One. However, they won the Suffolk Junior Cup the following season.

In 1986–87 Needham Market were Division One runners-up, earning promotion back to the Senior Division. They went on to win the Suffolk Senior Cup in 1989–90. In 1995–96 the club were Senior Division champions, and were promoted to Division One of the Eastern Counties League. They were Division One runners-up in 2004–05 and were promoted to the Premier Division, winning the Suffolk Senior Cup in the same season. In 2006–07 the club win the East Anglian Cup, before going on to finish as runners-up in the Premier Division and win the League Challenge Cup and the Suffolk Premier Cup in 2007–08, as well as reaching the semi-finals of the FA Vase, losing 4–2 on aggregate to Kirkham & Wesham.

The 2009–10 season saw Needham Market win the Premier Division title and the League Cup double, earning promotion to Division One North of the Isthmian League. In their first season in Division One, Needham finished as runners-up, qualifying for the promotion play-offs. However, they lost 3–1 at home to Brentwood Town in the semi-finals. The following season the club finished third and reached the play-off final, but lost 1–0 to Enfield Town. They qualified for the play-offs again after finishing fifth in 2013–14, this time losing 1–0 to Witham Town in the semi-finals. The club went on to win the division the following season, earning promotion to the Premier Division. In 2016–17 they won the Suffolk Premier Cup for a second time.

Needham Market were transferred to the Premier Central division of the Southern League at the end of the 2017–18 season as part of the restructuring of the non-League pyramid. In 2019–20 the club won the Suffolk Premier Cup, defeating Lowestoft Town 4–3 on aggregate in the two-legged final. In 2022–23 they reached the first round of the FA Cup for the first time, and were drawn away to Burton Albion.

Reserve team
The club's reserve team played in the Essex & Suffolk Border League, winning Division Two in 1998–99. In 2013 they joined Division One of the Eastern Counties League.

Ground
The club initially played at Young's Meadow, before relocating to Crowley Park. In 1996 they moved to a new ground, buying the site after former player Arthur Rodwell died and left the club money, which was used together with a grant from the National Lottery. The new ground was named Bloomfields after former player and clubman Derrick Bloomfield.

A new record attendance of 750 was set for a Suffolk Premier Cup match against Ipswich Town reserves during the 2006–07 season. This was beaten when a crowd of 1,375 watched the FA Vase semi-final against Kirkham & Wesham in 2008. Another new record was set on 26 October 2013 when 1,748 saw the club play Cambridge United in an FA Cup fourth qualifying round game.

In 2018 a 3G pitch with a 50-seat stand and new changing rooms were installed within the Bloomfields complex, which is used by the reserve team.

Current squad
 

The Southern Football League does not use a squad numbering system.

Management and coaching staff

Boardroom

Current staff

Honours
Isthmian League
Division One North champions 2014–15
Eastern Counties League
Premier Division champions 2009–10
League Cup winners 2007–08, 2009–10
Suffolk & Ipswich League
Senior Division champions 1995–96
Division One champions 1952–53
Division Two champions 1946–47
Division Two A champions 1932–33
League Cup winners 1977–78, 1979–80
Suffolk Premier Cup
Winners 2007–08, 2016–17, 2019–20
Suffolk Senior Cup
Winners 1989–90, 2004–05
Suffolk Junior Cup
Winners 1984–85
East Anglian Cup
Winners 2006–07

Records
Best FA Cup performance: First round, 2022–23
Best FA Trophy performance: Quarter-finals, 2021–22
Best FA Vase performance: Semi-finals, 2007–08
Record attendance: 1,784 vs Cambridge United, FA Cup fourth qualifying round, 26 October 2013
Biggest win: 10–1 vs Ipswich Wanderers, 1 September 2007, FA Cup preliminary round
Heaviest defeat: 6–0 vs Wingate & Finchley, 8 September 2015, Isthmian League Premier Division
Most appearances: Rhys Barber, 365 (2006–2012)
Most goals: Sam Newson, 134 (2010–2015)
Most goals in a season: Craig Parker, 40 (2010–11)

See also
Needham Market F.C. players
Needham Market F.C. managers

References

External links
Official website

 
Football clubs in England
Football clubs in Suffolk
Association football clubs established in 1919
1919 establishments in England
Suffolk and Ipswich Football League
Eastern Counties Football League
Isthmian League
Southern Football League clubs
Needham Market